The California Department of Water Resources (DWR) is part of the California Natural Resources Agency and is responsible for the management and regulation of the State of California's water usage. The department was created in 1956 by Governor Goodwin Knight following severe flooding across Northern California in 1955, where they combined the Division of Water Resources of the Department of Public Works with the State Engineer's Office, the Water Project Authority, and the State Water Resources Board. It is headquartered in Sacramento.

History

1850-1875
California recognizes many types of water rights. Prior to the Treaty of Guadalupe Hidalgo, signed in 1848, California was part of Mexico. Riparian rights were the most prevalent type of water right. Under riparian rights, which have their origins in Roman law, a landowner can use water flowing by his property for use on his property. When California became part of the United States, the United States agreed to recognize existing law. Pueblo rights were the only vested water rights at the time. Pueblo rights provided that Spanish and Mexican pueblos were entitled to the paramount beneficial use of all needed naturally occurring water from the entire watershed of a stream flowing through the pueblo.

When gold was discovered in 1848, immigrants from all over the world came to California. During the California Gold Rush, gold miners would divert large quantities of water from rivers and streams for hydraulic mining. Local custom dictated how water was shared in mining camps, but in general, the miners followed the same practice in allocating water as they did in staking their mineral claims. In its earliest form, an appropriative water right was created simply by taking water and putting it to beneficial use. However, to "state a claim" miners would often post a notice to others that they were taking and using water. Soon after California became a U.S. state in 1850, the first session of the California State Legislature immediately adopted laws to deal with the state's water. This included the adoption of the English common law system, which also included the doctrine of riparian rights, although this system was better suited to the water-rich eastern United States. Shortly thereafter, Californian courts recognized appropriative water rights.

Because of these plural systems of water allocation, disputes soon ensued; these differences were resolved by the state courts. In 1872, the Legislature adopted a procedure in the Civil Code to provide a method for those claiming an appropriative water right to record their claims with the county recorder of each county. In 1886, the courts addressed competing claims between riparians and appropriators in the case of "Lux v. Haggin." However, within 25 years, excessive claims to water rights threatened to affect economic development in the state. In response, the governor formed a Water Commission to make recommendations regarding California's water law. In 1913, Californian voters adopted by referendum the Water Commission Act, which created the state Water Commission and set forth an administrative procedure for acquiring an appropriative right.

In 1926, the courts held that a riparian water user was entitled to the full flow of a stream, without regard to the reasonableness of the use. In response, in 1928, the California Constitution was amended to require that all water use in California be reasonable and beneficial. (Article X, Section 2).

1875–1900

In 1878, William Hammond Hall of the Office of State Engineer conducted a series of investigations in California's Central Valley and drafted a series of plans calling for various publicly funded and owned irrigation projects. Hall's study was accomplished on a budget of $100,000. The Central Valley continued to grow in the absence of a state-run project, yet Central Valley landowners and coastal cities (including San Francisco) managed to acquire water rights in the Sierra Nevada mountain range for use in the valley.

1900–1925

In response to growing political and legal contests for limited water resources, the Water Commission Act of 1913 established the Water Commission to oversee permits associated with the rights to use surface water. The Water Commission Act became effective on December 19, 1914. Landowners or water users that had established water usage prior to 1914 became senior water rights users in many of the more accessible watersheds in the state. Appropriative water rights were processed by the Division of Water Rights, originally under the State Engineer, and subsequently under the Department of Water Resources, the State Water Rights Board, and finally, the State Water Resources Control Board.

In 1919, Col. Robert B. Marshall, Chief Surveyor for the U.S. Geological Survey, proposed a plan for the federal government to build a series of diversion dams, and two grand canals along the sides of the Sacramento and San Joaquin Valleys, consequently irrigating California's Central Valley. Though national interest in Marshall's plan was limited, there was an interest in California for pursuing the proposed project.

1925–1950

In 1927, the California State Legislature passed a law authorizing the Department of Finance to file applications with the Division of Water Rights to reserve any unappropriated surface water for future development. A number of claims were filed on July 30, 1927. The department subsequently acquired water rights permits that resulted from some of these filings. In 1933, the California State Legislature and Governor James Rolph approved the construction of the Central Valley Project, with initial plans to build a 420-foot dam at Kennett. This would provide regular flows out to the San Francisco Estuary, reducing salinity intrusion into the Sacramento-San Joaquin Delta. Unable to finance the construction of Kennett Dam, the state applied to the federal government for aid. After the U.S. House of Representatives Committee on Rivers and Harbors reviewed the state plans, Congress enacted the Rivers and Harbors Act of 1935, giving the U.S. federal government control over the Central Valley Project (CVP).

1950–1975

In the mid-1950s, California was experiencing substantial growth. San Francisco's Caspar W. Weinberger, Chairman of the California Assembly Government Organization Committee, held a series of statewide hearings in 1954 and 1955 focused on creating a State Water Project that could supply the growing municipal and agricultural demands of the state. On July 5, 1956, in a special session of the California Assembly, Governor Goodwin J. Knight signed Weinberger's bill to combine the then Division of Water Resources of the Department of Public Works with the State Engineer's Office, the Water Project Authority, and the State Water Resources Board into a new department: the Department of Water Resources. Consulting engineer Harvey O. Banks was appointed by Governor Knight as the department's first director and given the task of developing a plan for the proposed State Water Project.

In 1959, the Legislature enacted the Burns-Porter Act which authorized $1.75 billion for the construction of the proposed State Water Project. The Burns-Porter Act was approved by Californian voters in 1960 and in the same year the Whale Rock Dam, DWR's first major water project located near San Luis Obispo, was completed.

In 1961, William Warne was appointed director of the department and oversaw the construction of a key facility in the operation of the State Water Project: Oroville Dam. The DWR and the United States Bureau of Reclamation also signed an agreement to design a joint reservoir in San Luis. Because water from the Oroville and Shasta dams (from the existing Central Valley Project) would be moved down the existing Sacramento River channel into the Sacramento-San Joaquin River Delta, excess flows would roll through the delta and then be stored in the Central Valley until needed. Construction of the Harvey O. Banks Pumping Plant, located near Tracy, California, also began in 1963.

DWR timeline

Legal and political authorization
Though the DWR was formed in 1956 with the purpose to build and operate the State Water Project, as a state organization responsible for the development and protection of water resources, the department has since been subject to numerous legislative, judicial, and administrative orders that dictate how the department should protect the public trust. Like any other water user, the DWR must apply for water rights permits from the State Water Resources Control Board. The water rights decisions of the Control Board limit the amount of water that the department can provide to communities and also are responsible for many of the legal, administrative, and environmental projects that the department has adopted. Unlike most other users, the department also must answer to the Governor's Office and State Legislature. Flood control and local assistance programs often have a basis in the DWR's role as a resource trustee, while water supply, environmental mitigation, and electricity generation are often related to the DWR's role as a water permittee.

State Water Project

Scope
The project makes deliveries to two-thirds of California's population. It includes 34 storage facilities, reservoirs and lakes; 20 pumping plants; four pumping-generating plants; five hydroelectric power plants; and about 701 miles of open canals and pipelines.

State Water Project facts and figures

List of DWR projects

Conveyance and storage facilities
 Oroville Dam (1967)
 North Bay Aqueduct
 Clifton Court Forebay
 Harvey O. Banks Pumping Plant (1968)
 South Bay Aqueduct
 California Aqueduct
 West Branch
 East Branch
 Coastal Branch
 O'Neill Forebay
 San Luis Reservoir (1967)
 Whale Rock Dam (1960)
 Edmonston Pumping Plant (1971)
 Silverwood Lake
 Lake Perris

Flood control projects
 Sutter Bypass
 Tisdale Weir
 Tisdale Bypass
 Sacramento Weir
 Yolo Bypass

Recreation projects

 Antelope Dam (1964)

Mitigation/restoration projects
The following is a list of projects that the DWR oversees or contributes to that are designed to mitigate the impacts of the operation of the State Water Project.

 Feather River Salmon and Steelhead Hatchery (1967)
 Thermalito Afterbay (1968)
 Yolo Bypass Wildlife Recreation Area
 Suisun Marsh
 Skinner Fish Facility
 South Delta Improvements Program 
 South Delta Temporary Barriers Program

List of directors
This is a list of DWR directors.

Regions and drainage areas
The state recognizes 10 hydrologic regions and 3 additional drainage areas. The hydrologic regions are further subdivided into 515 groundwater basins.

 North Coast hydrologic region 
 Sacramento River hydrologic region
 North Lahontan hydrologic region
 San Francisco Bay hydrologic region
 San Joaquin River hydrologic region
 Central Coast hydrologic region
 Tulare Lake hydrologic region
 South Lahontan hydrologic region
 South Coast hydrologic region
 Colorado River hydrologic region
 South Coast hydrologic region
 Northern Central Valley drainage area
 Mid-Central Valley drainage area
 Southern Central Valley drainage area

See also

 
 California Environmental Protection Agency (CAL EPA)
 California State Water Resources Control Board (SWRCB)
 Southern California Coastal Water Research Project
 United States Bureau of Reclamation

References

External links
 California Department of Water Resources official site
 DWR South Delta Improvements Program
 DWR publications and digitized DWR reports on archive.org

Water Resources
Water Resources

 
California State Water Project
Hydrology organizations
State environmental protection agencies of the United States

Government agencies established in 1956
1956 establishments in California